Samurai Pizza Cats is an American animated television adaptation of the anime series Kyatto Ninden Teyandee (Cat Ninja Legend Teyandee), produced by Tatsunoko Productions and Sotsu Agency. The series originally aired in Japan on TV Tokyo from February 1, 1990 to February 12, 1991 for a total of 54 episodes. Saban Entertainment picked up the North American rights to the series in 1991 and produced a 52-episode English adaptation.

When Saban licensed the English version, proper translations of and information about the original Japanese episodes were either of poor quality or non-existent. It was decided to write completely original dialogue for the English dub, playing the show as a wacky, Animaniacs-esque comedy in contrast to the less farcical original. The English-language version became a cult hit among anime fans due to its rapid-fire pop-culture references and farcical nature.

Saban's distribution rights to the series expired on November 12, 2000. Discotek Media currently holds the North American home video license to the series in North America, while Madman Entertainment holds the license for Australia and New Zealand.

Crunchyroll began streaming the series on December 27, 2015. The series became available for streaming to Amazon Prime subscribers in late 2018. In 2020, it became available on Tubi. In 2021, it became available on Peacock.

Plot

The series is set in Little Tokyo, a mechanical city which fuses feudal Japanese culture with contemporary culture, and is populated by cybernetic anthropomorphic animals. The city is nominally led by Emperor Fred, a doddering eccentric. The city's actual leadership lies in the hands of the city council and the emperor's daughter, Princess Violet. The council is headed by ambitious Prime Minister Seymour "The Big" Cheese, a rat who constantly plots to overthrow the Emperor. Big Cheese is aided by his inept minions: trusted adviser Jerry Atric and Bad Bird, the leader of an army of ninja crows.

Unknown to the prime minister, council member and palace guard commander "Big Al" Dente has learned of his designs on leadership, but is unable to prosecute him for treason because of the plausible deniability he maintains. Instead, Al Dente enlists the services of Speedy Cerviche, Polly Esther, and Guido Anchovy, three cyborg cat samurai who work in the city's pizzeria, along with their operator Francine. Known collectively as the Samurai Pizza Cats, the three are assigned to stop Big Cheese and his evil henchmen's plans to take over Little Tokyo.

Characters

Production
When Saban Entertainment licensed Kyatto Ninden Teyandee, 52 of the 54 episodes that were produced in Japan were translated into English. The two untranslated episodes were clip shows that did little to further the series' plot. Some episodes of the dubbed version were never aired in the United States, due to censorship issues.

The music in the English dub (replacing the original Japanese music) was by Shuki Levy and Haim Saban (credited as Kussa Mahchi). In keeping with the parodic nature of the show, the lyrics of the new theme song make a number of references to American pop culture.

Michael Airington, a writer for the series, also sang the theme song (using a voice very similar to actor Paul Lynde), being credited as "Singing Sensation: Googie Gomez". According to the producer Andy Thomas, Airington had a few drinks before the recording session for the song started, and as a result, accidentally stuttered on one line ("this cat gets down down with a love hangover"); that mistake was kept in the final version of the theme.

Broadcast
The English version of the series first aired in the United Kingdom on ITV on August 31, 1991,  with repeats continuing until 1995. In Canada, the series first appeared in 1992, on YTV, and in 1996, in the United States, on first-run syndication. The series was broadcast on Australian television on the weekday Seven Network morning kid's wrapper programme Agro's Cartoon Connection, from April 1992. A repeat run occurred in the same time slot in early 1994.

Release
Samurai Pizza Cats has been broadcast in Australia, New Zealand, the United Kingdom, Colombia, India, Spain, Finland, Trinidad and Tobago, France, Italy, Poland, Greece, the Netherlands, Germany, Canada, Chile, Peru, Panama, Hong Kong, Thailand, Mexico, Brazil, Israel, Kenya, South Africa, Zimbabwe, Sweden, Armenia, the Philippines, the United States, Portugal, Nigeria, and Russia from 1991 onwards.

Discotek Media released the show in both the original Japanese-language version and the North American English-language version dubbed by Saban. DVDs were released in region 1 format, with the Japanese version in Dolby Stereo 2.0 and English version in Dolby Digital Mono. The Kyatto-Ninden Teyandee: Complete Uncut Japanese Language Collection was released on April 30, 2013 and the English-dubbed version, Samurai Pizza Cats: Complete English Language TV Series Collection – 8 Disc Set, was released on July 30, 2013. The Kyatto-Ninden Teyandee: Complete Uncut Japanese Language Collection set includes all of the 54 original episodes (including the two clip-show episodes that were never dubbed into English) while the Samurai Pizza Cats: Complete English Language TV Series Collection set includes all 52 English-dubbed episodes. A French-language version, titled Samouraï Pizza Cats, which features a French dub adapted from the English dub, was released on DVD in France by Declic Images across two 5-disc box sets (26 episodes per set) in 2004.

Madman Entertainment released the show on DVD for Australia initially in two collections, with four discs in each set. Collection 1, containing episodes 1–26, was released on October 16, 2013; collection 2 containing episodes 27–52, was released on December 4, 2013. A box set of the complete series was released by Madman on April 6, 2016.

Discotek Media released the Samurai Pizza Cats: The Complete Collection on Blu-ray on January 19, 2016. This release featured every episode in standard definition on a single disk.

Merchandise
Various toys and model kits were released in both Japan and Europe by Bandai, the latter usually being reboxed versions of the prior. Action figures for the Samurai Pizza Cats and the Rescue Team (the Japanese originals came as model kits comparable to today's Gundam toys, while the European figures came pre-assembled). There were also both large and small (Gachapon-sized) rubber-like figures and playsets for the smaller figures, including the Great Catatonic and the pizza parlor.

Video game
In 1991, Tecmo published a platform video game based on Kyatto Ninden Teyandee for the Famicom (NES) in Japan.

The main characters of the series were also intended at one point to appear in the Wii fighting game Tatsunoko vs. Capcom: Ultimate All-Stars. The game's producer, Ryota Niitsuma, was quoted in an interview as saying, "One of the main anime we got more requests for than any others was Samurai Pizza Cats... I wanted to see that, but we couldn't reach an agreement."

American comics
Samurai Pizza Cats comics were released as back-up stories in Saban Powerhouse (published by Valiant/Acclaim) which ran for two issues in 1997.

Notes

References

External links
 

1990s American animated television series
1990s American comic science fiction television series
1990 anime television series debuts
1991 American television series debuts
American children's animated action television series
American children's animated comic science fiction television series
American children's animated science fantasy television series
American television series based on Japanese television series
Cross-dressing in television
Discotek Media
Animated television series about cats
ITV children's television shows
Seven Network original programming
Tatsunoko Production
Television series by Saban Entertainment
YTV (Canadian TV channel) original programming